Michael Joseph Winkelmann (born 20 June 1981), known professionally as Beeple, is an American digital artist, graphic designer, and animator known for selling NFTs. In his art, he uses various mediums to create comical, phantasmagoric works that make political and social commentary while using pop culture figures as references. British auction house Christie's has called him "A visionary digital artist at the forefront of NFTs". Beeple was introduced to NFTs in October 2020 and credits Pak for providing his first "primer" on selling NFTs. The NFT associated with Everydays: the First 5000 Days, a collage of images from his "Everydays" series, was sold on March 12, 2021, for $69 million in cryptocurrency to an investor in NFTs. It is the first purely non-fungible token to be sold by Christie's. The auction house had previously sold Block 21, an NFT with accompanying physical painting for approximately $130,000 in October 2020.

Early life
Winkelmann was born on 20 June 1981. He grew up in North Fond du Lac, Wisconsin. His father worked as an electrical engineer, and his mother worked at a senior center. Winkelmann graduated from Purdue University in 2003 majoring in computer science.

Art career

"Everydays"
Winkelmann started "Everydays", which involved creating a piece of art every day, on May 1, 2007. This project is ongoing and has spanned more than 5,000 consecutive days of digital art creation. Winkelmann has discussed completing a piece of art even on days when it was inconvenient, like on his wedding day and the day of his children's births.
The project was inspired by Tom Judd, who did a drawing every day for a year. Winkelmann thought it was a beneficial way to sharpen his drawing skills. In the following years, he focused on one skill or medium per year, including Adobe Illustrator in 2012 and Cinema 4D in 2015. Winkelmann's works often depict dystopian futures. Frequently, he uses recognizable figures from popular culture or politics to satirize current events.

Some of Winkelmann's works were incorporated into Louis Vuitton's Spring/Summer 2019 ready-to-wear collection.

NFT sales

In February 2021, Winkelmann started selling non-fungible tokens, digital tokens associated with works of art whose ownership is verified by a blockchain.  The first two Beeple NFTs were sold at an auction at ETHDenver, and more were sold on Nifty Gateway in November 2020. One of these NFTs, Crossroad, would change into one of two animations depending on the victor of the 2020 United States presidential election; it was sold for $66,666.66 and resold for $6.7 million in February 2021.

The NFT associated with Everydays: the First 5000 Days, a collage of images from the "Everydays" series, was put up for auction at Christie's on February 25 and sold for $69,400,000 on March 11, 2021. This was the first NFT to be sold by a legacy auction house, and is the first sale at Christie's that could be paid in Ether. In March 2021 Beeple called NFTs an "irrational exuberance bubble".

On 9 November 2021, one of Beeple's artworks (HUMAN ONE) was sold at Christie's for $28,958,000 to collector Ryan Zurrer. The artwork is a 7-foot-high sculpture; a generative work of art, a dynamically changing hybrid sculpture, both physically and digitally. Beeple described this artwork as "the first portrait of a human born in the metaverse." This is the first major work made by the artist that has both a sculptural and NFT component. After the sale, HUMAN ONE was exhibited at the Castello di Rivoli Museum of Contemporary Art in April 2022. This was the artist's debut museum exhibition. Subsequently, the work was shown at the M+ Museum, marking the work's Asian premiere and the artist's first solo show in Asia.

Personal life
Winkelmann is based in North Charleston, South Carolina, having moved from Wisconsin in 2017. He is married and has two children.

Gallery

See also
List of most expensive non-fungible tokens

References

External links
 Beeple Crap website
 Twitter

1981 births
21st-century American artists
21st-century American male artists
American animators
American digital artists
Artists from Wisconsin
Graphic artists
Internet memes
Living people
People associated with Ethereum
People from Fond du Lac County, Wisconsin
VJs (media personalities)